Paul Winkler (22 August 1913 – 1996) was a German international footballer.

References

1913 births
1996 deaths
Association football forwards
German footballers
Germany international footballers